Mohamed Hammadi (born 13 July 1985) is a Paralympic wheelchair racer from United Arab Emirates who competes in category T34 short and middle-distance events. He won two medals in the 100 m and 200 m sprint at the 2012 Paralympics. At the 2016 Rio Games, he placed fourth over 100 m, but won the 800 m event.

References

Male wheelchair racers
Paralympic athletes of the United Arab Emirates
Athletes (track and field) at the 2012 Summer Paralympics
Athletes (track and field) at the 2016 Summer Paralympics
Athletes (track and field) at the 2020 Summer Paralympics
Paralympic gold medalists for the United Arab Emirates
Paralympic bronze medalists for the United Arab Emirates
Paralympic silver medalists for the United Arab Emirates
Living people
World record holders in Paralympic athletics
Medalists at the 2012 Summer Paralympics
Medalists at the 2016 Summer Paralympics
Medalists at the 2020 Summer Paralympics
1985 births
World Para Athletics Championships winners
Paralympic medalists in athletics (track and field)